The Makarska massacre (Croatian: Pokolj u Makarskoj) was the mass murder of Croat civilians  by Chetnik forces, led by Petar Baćović, from 28 August until early-September 1942, across several villages in the Dalmatian Hinterland of southern Croatia, around the town of Makarska.

Timeline

The massacres took place during the final stages of the Italian-led Operation "Albia", which involved the participation of hundreds of Chetnik forces from Herzegovina and local  MVAC Chetniks, with the objective of destroying Partisan forces in the Biokovo area. During their advance to the Makarska coast, Chetnik forces destroyed and massacred several Croat villages.

The first attacks started on 29 August 1942, with the destruction of the Croat villages of Rašćane, Kozica, Dragljane and Župa, near Vrgorac. Hundreds of homes were destroyed and between 141 and 160 Croat civilians were killed. Among those killed included three Catholic Priests, who were skinned alive before being killed.

Baćović's Chetniks continued their advance to the Makarska coast into September 1942, razing a total of 17 Croat villages and killing 900 Croats.

In a report sent by Baćović to Draža Mihailović in September 1942, it was reported that:

On 3 September 1942, Mihailović replied to Baćovic's report:

Aftermath
The crimes committed by Chetnik forces in the Makarska area were discussed as part of the trial against Draža Mihailović in 1946. Mihailović was ultimately found guilty of eight counts of crimes against humanity and high treason. Mihailović, sentenced to death on 15 July 1946, was executed with nine other Chetnik commanders in Lisičji Potok in the early hours of 18 July 1946.

References

Massacres of Croats
1942 in Yugoslavia
Chetnik war crimes in World War II
Massacres in 1942
August 1942 events
September 1942 events
Massacres in Yugoslavia
Persecution of Catholics
World War II massacres
Massacres in Croatia